The 1964 Pau Grand Prix was a Formula Two motor race held on 5 April 1964 at the Pau circuit, in Pau, Pyrénées-Atlantiques, France. The Grand Prix was won by Jim Clark, driving the Lotus 32. Richard Attwood finished second and Peter Arundell third.

Classification

Race

References

Pau Grand Prix
1964 in French motorsport